One-way traffic (or uni-directional traffic) is traffic that moves in a single direction.  A one-way street is a street either facilitating only one-way traffic, or designed to direct vehicles to move in one direction.  One-way streets typically result in higher traffic flow as drivers may avoid encountering oncoming traffic or turns through oncoming traffic.  Residents may dislike one-way streets due to the circuitous route required to get to a specific destination, and the potential for higher speeds adversely affecting pedestrian safety.  Some studies even challenge the original motivation for one-way streets, in that the circuitous routes negate the claimed higher speeds.

Signage

General signs

Signs are posted showing which direction the vehicles can move in: commonly an upward arrow, or on a T junction where the main road is one-way, an arrow to the left or right. At the end of the street through which vehicles may not enter, a prohibitory traffic sign "Do Not Enter", "Wrong Way", or "No Entry" sign is posted, e.g. with that text, or a round red sign with a white horizontal bar. Sometimes one portion of a street is one-way, another portion two-way. An advantage of one-way streets is that drivers do not have to watch for vehicles coming in the opposite direction on this type of street.

No entry signs

The abstract "No Entry" sign was officially adopted for standardization at the League of Nations convention in Geneva in 1931. The sign was adapted from Swiss usage, derived from the practice of former European states that marked their boundaries with their formal shield symbols. Restrictions on entry were indicated by tying a blood-red ribbon horizontally around the shield. The sign is also known as C1, from its definition in the Vienna Convention on Road Signs and Signals.

The European "No Entry" sign was adopted into North American uniform signage in the late 1960s / 1970s, replacing a previous white square sign bearing only the English text in black "Do Not Enter". In addition to the standardized graphic symbol, the US version still retains the wording "Do Not Enter", while the European and Canadian versions typically have no text.

Applications

One-way streets may be part of a one-way system, which facilitates a smoother flow of motor traffic through, for example, a city center grid; as in the case of Bangalore, India. This is achieved by arranging one-way streets that cross in such a fashion as to eliminate right turns (for driving on left) or left turns (for driving on right). Traffic light systems at such junctions may be simpler and may be coordinated to produce a green wave.

Some of the reasons one-way traffic is specified:
The street is too narrow for movement in both directions and the road users unable to coordinate easily
Prevent drivers from cutting through residential streets to bypass traffic lights or other requirements to stop (a so-called "rat run")
Discourage drivers from cruising through a residential neighborhood (e.g. by having mostly one-way streets pointing outwards, with relatively few vehicular entrances)
Part of a one-way pair of two parallel one-way streets in opposite directions (such as a divided highway)
For a proper functioning of a system of paid parking or other restricted vehicular access (these may also use one-way treadles which puncture tires if traversed in the forbidden direction)
To calm traffic, especially in historic city centers
Eliminate turns that involve crossing in front of oncoming traffic
Increase traffic flow and potentially reduce traffic congestion
Eliminate the need for a center turn lane that can instead be used for travel
Better traffic flow in densely built-up areas where road widening may not be feasible
Simplify pedestrian crossing of the street due to walkers only needing to look for oncoming traffic in one direction
Eliminate cars' driver-side doors opening into the travel lane in parallel parking spaces for parking lanes located on the left (right-hand drive) or right (left-hand drive) side of a street
Locate a one-way bike lane on the opposite side of the street from parallel parking spaces to prevent dooring
Limited-access highway entrance and exit ramps.

Left turn on red
In the United States, 37 states and Puerto Rico allow left turns on red only if both the origin and destination streets are one way. See South Carolina law Section 56-5-970 C3, for example. Five other statesAlaska, Idaho, Michigan, Oregon, and Washingtonalso allow left turns on red into a one-way street from a two-way street.

History
An attempt was apparently made in 1617 to introduce one-way streets in alleys near the River Thames in London by The Worshipful Company of Carmen who were commissioned by the King to regulate traffic in the square mile of the City of London. The next one-way street in London was Albemarle Street in Mayfair, the location of the Royal Institution. It was so designated in 1800 because the public science lectures were so popular there. The first one-way streets in Paris were the Place Charles de Gaulle around the Arc de Triomphe, the Rue de Mogador and the Rue de la Chaussée-d'Antin, created on 13 December 1909.

According to the folklore of Eugene, Oregon, the use of one-way streets in the United States started in Eugene itself. In 1941 6th Ave was converted into a one-way avenue by the Highway Department. Other sources claim the fad arose in relation to the disaster of the SS Morro Castle.  On 9 September 1934, the on-fire SS Morro Castle was towed to the New Jersey shoreline near the Asbury Park Convention Center and the sightseeing traffic was enormous. The Asbury Park Police Chief decided to make the Ocean Avenue one-way going north and the street one block over (Kingsley) in one-way going south, creating a circular route. By the 1950s this "cruising the circuit" became a draw to the area in itself since teens would drive around it looking to hook up with other teens. The circuit was in place until the streets went back to two way in 2007 due to new housing and retail development.

One-way traffic of pedestrians
Sometimes one-way walking is specified for smooth pedestrian traffic flow, or in the case of entrance checks (such as ticket checks) and exit checks (e.g. the check-out in a shop). They may be outdoors (e.g. an extra exit of a zoo), or in a building, or in a vehicle (e.g. a tram). In addition to signs, there may be various forms and levels of enforcement, such as:
personnel; sometimes a "soft" traffic control system is supported by vigilant staff monitoring
a turnstile; however, turnstile jumping is possible
a High Entrance/Exit Turnstile (HEET)
a one-way revolving door
an escalator; however, the escalator can be traversed in opposite direction, by walking up or down the stairs faster than it moves
an elevator that can only be called from one floor; this is common in IKEA stores.
 Two-way elevators: passengers enter from the front on one floor and exit from the back in another floor.
a door or gate that can only be opened from one side (a manual or electric lock, or simply a door that is pushed open and has no doorknob on the other side), or which automatically opens from one side. (However, with help from someone on the other side, it may often be bypassed in the reverse direction.)
entrance of a shop
an emergency exit, which may activate an alarm
 Airports - (e.g. passport control, customs, baggage security)

Sometimes a door or gate can be opened freely from one side, and only with a key or by inserting a coin from the other side (house door, door with a coin slot, e.g. giving entrance to a pay toilet). The latter can be passed without paying when somebody else leaves, and by multiple persons if only one pays (as opposed to a coin-operated turnstile).

See also
Circulation plan
 Glossary of road transport terms

References

Types of roads